Lindsay Davenport was the defending champion, but could not participate due to a back injury.

Nadia Petrova won the title, defeating Francesca Schiavone 6–4, 6–4 in the championships match.

Seeds
The top eight seeds received a bye into the second round.

Draw

Finals

Top half

Section 1

Section 2

Bottom half

Section 3

Section 4

External links
 ITF tournament edition details

Singles
Bausch and Lomb Championships